Pingshu Township is a township under the administration of Shouyang County in Shanxi, China. , it has eleven villages under its administration.
Pingshu Village
Tai'an Village
Gucheng Village
Xike Village
Dongke Village
Huangling Village
Guoyi Village
Angong Village
Duanwang Village
Shangyu Village
Longmenhe Village

References 

Township-level divisions of Shanxi
Shouyang County